Ariocarpus trigonus is a species of flowering plant in the family Cactaceae, native to Mexico (the states of Tamaulipas and Nuevo León).

References

External links

trigonus
Flora of Mexico